Clarkson GO Station is a GO Transit railway station and bus station in Mississauga, Ontario, Canada. It is a stop on the Lakeshore West line train service, serving the Clarkson neighbourhood.

History

The original railway station was located about 800 meters to the east of the present day station, on the north side of the railway tracks, behind Warren Clarkson's store and Post Office on the west side of Clarkson Road (Today Clarkson Road North). It was built in 1853 by the Great Western Railway at the corner of the property which became known as Clarkson's Corner. The apostrophe in Clarkson's was removed from the sign in 1956, on the CNR station which burned down in 1962, although Corner had long since disappeared from usage.

The station brought commerce to local fruit and vegetable farmers, with corn, apples and especially strawberries being the main produce in Clarkson. In 1915, a sign was erected at the station declaring "Through this station passes more strawberries than any other station in Ontario."

To augment the existing 1,500-space parking structure, an additional garage with 1,200 spaces was built between June 2012 and April 2014.

In 2018, Fortinos signed a deal with Metrolinx to have a PC Express kiosk at this station for online orders.

Local bus service
The station is served by MiWay and Oakville Transit routes:

MiWay
13 Glen Erin (7 days)
14 Lorne Park (weekday off-peak)
14A Lorne Park to Winston Churchill (weekday rush hour)
23 Lakeshore (7 days)
29 Park Royal-Homelands (7 days)
45 Winston Churchill (7 days)
45A Winston Churchill via Speakman (weekday rush hour)
110 University Express (7 days)

Oakville Transit
4 - Speers-Cornwall (7 days)
11 Linbrook (weekdays)
12 - Winston Park (weekdays)

References

External links

GO Transit railway stations
Railway stations in Mississauga
Railway stations in Canada opened in 1853
Canadian National Railway stations in Ontario